The men's Greek-style discus throw was one of six throwing events on the Athletics at the 1908 Summer Olympics programme in London. The competition was held on 18 July 1908. In the Greek-style event, throwers hurled the discus from atop a rectangular platform raised above the ground. Throwing style was strictly prescribed by the rules of the event. The event had been contested at the 1906 Summer Olympics, but was not held again after 1908. NOCs could enter up to 12 athletes.

Results

References

Sources
 Official Report of the Games of the IV Olympiad (1908).
 De Wael, Herman. Herman's Full Olympians: "Athletics 1908". Accessed 7 April 2006.

Athletics at the 1908 Summer Olympics
Discus throw at the Olympics